Lower Matecumbe Beach is a neighborhood within the village of Islamorada in Monroe County, Florida, United States.  It is located in the upper Florida Keys on the southwestern half of Lower Matecumbe Key.

Geography

References

Neighborhoods in Islamorada, Florida